Tepidibacter formicigenes  is a Gram-positive, spore-forming and anaerobic bacterium from the genus of Tepidibacter which has been isolated from hydrothermal vent fluid from the Mid-Atlantic Ridge.

References 

Peptostreptococcaceae
Bacteria described in 2004